Jalpaiguri Polytechnic Institute is the one of the oldest government polytechnic located in Jalpaiguri,  West Bengal, India.

About college
This college offers diploma courses in 4 (four) streams of Engineering conducted by West Bengal State Council of Technical Education.  This college was established in 1961 in the form of a Govt. Sponsored Polytechnic and subsequently it became a Government Polytechnic. It is an elite Institute of Jalpaiguri District with the maximum percentage of placement in Government and Private sectors. This college has a strong infrastructure consisting of well equipped and spacious laboratories, workshops, library, audio-visual cell, training and placement cell etc. This polytechnic is affiliated to the West Bengal State Council of Technical Education,  and recognised by AICTE, New Delhi.

Departments
Full Time Diploma Courses:( Duration: 3 years)
Civil Engineering
Electrical Engineering
Mechanical Engineering
Electronics and Communication Engineering

See also

References

External links
Jalpaiguri Polytechnic Institute 
Official website WBSCTE
Department of Technical Education & Training, Government of West Bengal
Directorate of Technical Education & Training, Government of West Bengal

Universities and colleges in Jalpaiguri district
Educational institutions established in 1951
1951 establishments in West Bengal
Education in Jalpaiguri
Technical universities and colleges in West Bengal